The Dean of St Albans is the head of the Chapter of St Albans Cathedral in the city of St Albans, England in the Diocese of St Albans. As the Dean of St Albans is also the Rector of St Albans, with parochial responsibilities for the largest parish in the Church of England, it is regarded as one of the most senior Deaneries in the United Kingdom.

The Chapter and Dean of St Albans was founded and constituted by Letters patent in February 1900. The first incumbent was Walter Lawrance and the incumbent is Jo Kelly-Moore.

List of deans
1900–1914 Walter Lawrance
1914–1924 George Blenkin
1925–1935 Edward Henderson
1936–1955 Cuthbert Thicknesse
1955–1963 Kenneth Mathews
1964–1973 Noel Kennaby
1973–1993 Peter Moore
1994–2003 Christopher Lewis
2004–2021 Jeffrey John
2021–present Jo Kelly-Moore

References

 
St Albans
Diocese of St Albans